Erik Staffan Olsson (born 26 March 1964) is a  Swedish handball coach and former player. Olsson, who always played with no 13, was a left-handed right backcourt player with one of the most feared shots of all the elite players. Later in his career he won praise for his great playmaking skills.

From September 2022 he is the head coach of the Netherlands' men’s national team.

Player career
Olsson was born in Uppsala. He started his career, at the age of 10, in the Swedish team Skånela. Other clubs are Huttenberg, Niederwurzbach, HK Cliff, THW Kiel and Hammarby. He played 358 caps (852 goals) with the Sweden men's national handball team.

After a long career in Germany he returned to Sweden and played his final season in Hammarby Handball, a club he later coached to three consecutive national championships.

Olympics
In 1988 he was a member of the Swedish handball team which finished fifth in the Olympic tournament. He played all six matches and scored 16 goals.

Four years later he was part of the Swedish team which won the silver medal. He played six matches and scored seven goals.

At the 1996 Games he won his second silver medal with the Swedish team. He played five matches and scored seven goals.

His last Olympic appearance was at the Sydney Games in 2000 when he won his third silver medal with the Swedish team. He played six matches and scored twelve goals.

Resume
 Caps/Goals: 357/852 goals (1984–2002)
 World champion 1990 (in Prague, Czechoslovakia) and 1999 (in Cairo, Egypt)
 European champion 1994, 1998, 2000 and 2002
 World champion runner up 1997
 3rd place in the 1993 and 1995 World championships
 German champion with THW Kiel 1998, 1999, 2000 and 2002
 Participated in four Summer Olympics: Seoul (1988), Barcelona (1992), Atlanta (1996) and Athens (2000)
 Swedish champion with Hammarby 2006, 2007 and 2008 (as coach)

References

External links
 

1964 births
Living people
Sportspeople from Uppsala
Swedish male handball players
Swedish handball coaches
National team coaches
Olympic handball players of Sweden
Olympic silver medalists for Sweden
Olympic medalists in handball
Handball players at the 1988 Summer Olympics
Handball players at the 1992 Summer Olympics
Handball players at the 1996 Summer Olympics
Handball players at the 2000 Summer Olympics
Medalists at the 1992 Summer Olympics
Medalists at the 1996 Summer Olympics
Medalists at the 2000 Summer Olympics
Swedish expatriate sportspeople in Germany
Swedish expatriate sportspeople in Spain
Liga ASOBAL players
CB Ademar León players
THW Kiel players
Hammarby IF Handboll players
Expatriate handball players
Handball-Bundesliga players